Microscydmus is a genus of beetles belonging to the family Staphylinidae.

The species of this genus are found in Europe, Australia and Northern America.

Species:
 Microscydmus abditus (Coquerel, 1860) 
 Microscydmus aberrans Franz, 1986

References

Staphylinidae
Staphylinidae genera